The Apotheosis of Saint Thomas Aquinas is a 1631 altarpiece painting by Francisco de Zurbarán, originally painted for the Dominican College of Seville, but now in the Museum of Fine Arts of Seville. It shows Saint Thomas Aquinas ascending to Heaven, where Christ, the Virgin Mary, the Apostle Paul, and Saint Dominic are enthroned, as the Holy Spirit descends upon him in the form of a dove; and surrounded by four other Doctors of the Church: Pope St. Gregory the Great, Saint Ambrose, Saint Jerome, and Saint Augustine of Hippo.

In the lower register of the picture, on the left a group of clergymen are kneeling, at the forefront of which is Diego Deza, founder of the college, with three Dominicans, Alonso de Ortiz, Pedro de Ballesteros and Diego Pinel; on the right, the Emperor Charles V and a group of unidentified figures in mozzettas; in the center on a table lies a parchment, on which several signatures can be seen, including that of Zurbarán himself.

References

Paintings of Pope Gregory I
Paintings of Thomas Aquinas
Paintings in the Museum of Fine Arts of Seville
1631 paintings
Paintings by Francisco de Zurbarán
Altarpieces
Books in art
Cultural depictions of Thomas Aquinas
Paintings depicting Jesus
Paintings depicting the Holy Trinity
Paintings of the Virgin Mary
Paintings of Ambrose